Anna Thammudu may refer to:

 Anna Thammudu (1958 film), a Telugu drama film
 Anna Thammudu (1990 film), a Telugu action drama film